Jacob Ingram (born February 23, 1985) is a former American football long snapper. He played college football at University of Hawaiʻi at Mānoa and was drafted by the New England Patriots in the sixth round of the 2009 NFL Draft as a center.

Early years
Ingram played football at Mililani High School in Mililani, Hawaii, on the island of Oahu where he also lettered in track, and grew up with a childhood friend, Sahil Muliyil, who was his "inspiration to play football".

College career
Originally a walk-on at defensive end, Hawaii coach, June Jones had him switch full-time to long snapper during his fourth game at Hawaii. He remained the team's long snapper for the rest of his collegiate career.

Professional career

New England Patriots
Ingram was drafted by the Patriots in the sixth round (198th overall) of the 2009 NFL Draft, the only long snapper selected in that draft. He competed with veteran long snapper Nathan Hodel, who was already on the roster when the Patriots drafted Ingram; Hodel was later released on August 31, 2009.

Ingram played in all 16 games of the 2009 season for the Patriots and helped kicker Stephen Gostkowski to make a career high 53-yard field goal.

In 2010, Ingram snapped for the first eight games of the season before being waived on November 10, 2010.

New Orleans Saints
Ingram was signed by the New Orleans Saints on November 20, 2010, replacing Jason Kyle, who was placed on injured reserve. He was waived by the Saints on November 22, 2010, after one game.

Tennessee Titans
Ingram was signed by the Titans before 2011, but was waived on August 18.

Jacksonville Jaguars
On August 27, 2011, Ingram signed with the Jacksonville Jaguars. He was cut on September 3, 2011.

Personal life
His younger brother, Luke was also a long snapper at Hawaii. Following his NFL career, Ingram was a police officer in Lanai for a while and then moved back to Maui.

References

External links
New Orleans Saints bio
New England Patriots bio
Hawaii Warriors bio

1985 births
Living people
Players of American football from Albuquerque, New Mexico
American football long snappers
Hawaii Rainbow Warriors football players
New England Patriots players
New Orleans Saints players
Tennessee Titans players
Jacksonville Jaguars players